Glaucias a rhetorician of Athens, who appears to have lived in the 1st century BC, but he is mentioned only by Plutarch.

References
Plutarch (Symposiacs i. 10, 3, ii. 2)

Ancient Greek rhetoricians
Ancient Athenians
1st-century Athenians
Roman-era Athenian rhetoricians